The New Zealand Cycle Friendly Awards were devised by the Cycling Advocates' Network (CAN) in 2003. The purpose of the awards is to acknowledge and celebrate some of the most notable achievements in the country that are helping to promote cycling and to create a cycle-friendly environment. Since 2016, the awards have been jointly organised with the New Zealand Transport Agency and rebranded as the 'Bike to the Future Awards'.

History and description 

CAN announced on 7 August 2003 that the awards had been created. The first awards ceremony was held on 10 October 2003 and the awards have since been awarded approximately annually.

There are several categories (four initially, since extended to five), and in each category there are up to five finalists. Those finalists are announced some time prior to the awards ceremony, enabling representatives to attend the awards function. In each category, one of the finalists is announced the winner during an awards ceremony. The awards function is typically combined with the biennial NZ Cycling Conference, or with the annual get together of CAN in the intervening years.

Finalists receive a certificate. Winners receive a certificate and a trophy; originally a bicycle bell mounted on a plinth.

In 2012, the opportunity has been taken to combine the awards with the "Golden Foot" Awards presented by walking advocates Living Streets Aotearoa. In addition a new joint award for all Walking and Cycling finalists was introduced. These initiatives were repeated in 2014, but the Golden Foot Awards have been subsequently awarded at a separate ceremony.

In 2016, the New Zealand Transport Agency took on organisation of the awards, with CAN still involved, and rebranded them as the 'Bike to the Future Awards'. A new trophy design, incorporating a stylised bicycle, was created for the winners.

A panel of judges uses criteria to individually assess the nominations. The judges work independent from one another, so can't influence each other, and don't know how the others are scoring. Combining the judges' scores by the awards coordinator determines the winner. The following criteria are used:

 Coverage – the number of people potentially affected
 Success to date – of initiatives / person in encouraging cycling
 Potential – applicability to other locations / organisations / commitment by person
 Innovation – relative uniqueness & innovation of initiative / person's action in New Zealand

Award categories

Best cycle facility project 
This category is for the transport infrastructure project year that has had the most significant impact on promoting cycling and a cycle-friendly environment in the past year. Examples could include new cycle ways, cycle parking facilities, or general roading projects that assist and encourage cycling. Nominations are typically received for projects undertaken by local or central government agencies.

Best cycling promotion
This category is for the education or encouragement project that has had the most significant impact on promoting cycling and a cycle-friendly environment in the past year. Examples could include publicity campaigns, school education programmes, or promotional cycling events. Nominations range from individuals to government organisations.

Cycle-friendly commitment by business
This category is for the companies that have made significant efforts encouraging and supporting cycling by its staff, customers and clients the past year. Examples of cycle-friendly actions include cyclist parking / changing facilities, employee support and incentive programmes, and company 'pool' bikes. Nominations cover both general businesses and those directly involved in the bicycle industry.

Cycle-friendly commitment by public organisation
This category is for the public or government organisation that has made significant efforts encouraging and supporting cycling by its staff and public users in the past year. This category includes central or local government agencies, and organisations such as health boards, universities or airports. Examples of cycle-friendly actions include cyclist parking / changing facilities, employee support and incentive programmes.

Cycling champion of the year
This category, first awarded in 2007, is designed to recognise the contribution made by individual New Zealanders to the promotion of cycling.

Winners and finalists
The following table shows the winners for the various years.

Winners by year

Other finalists by year
Between one and five finalists (including the winner) have been honoured in each category.

Awards functions

2003 awards function

The inaugural awards function was held on 10 October 2003 at the Bruce Mason Centre, North Shore City, as part of the dinner of the 4th New Zealand Cycling Conference. In the conference brochure, the event was advertised as the CAN best practice awards. The presenters and MCs for the awards were Glen Koorey (Christchurch) and Jane Dawson (Wellington), both members of the CAN executive.

Apart from the inaugural year, the awards have been presented by a Member of Parliament, as demonstrated by the photos.

2004 awards function

The 2nd awards were held in Wellington at the Beehive in Wellington on 22 November 2004. Thirteen finalists were honoured, with four nominees taking out the sought after winners' trophies. The awards were presented by the Hon Pete Hodgson, at the time the Minister of Transport. Glen Koorey was the MC for the event. Most of the finalists from around New Zealand were represented at the evening function. The 2004 awards were sponsored by SPARC.

2005 awards function

The 3rd awards were held on 14 October 2005 in Hutt City in conjunction with the 5th New Zealand Cycling Conference. Thirteen finalists were honoured, with four nominees taking out the sought after winners' trophies. The awards were presented by Jan Wright, who at the time was the chairman of the board of Land Transport New Zealand (LTNZ). Glen Koorey was the MC for the event. The 2005 awards were again sponsored by SPARC.

2006 awards function

The 4th awards were held in Wellington at the Parliament Buildings in Wellington on 18 November 2006. Thirteen finalists were honoured, with four nominees taking out the sought after winners' trophies. The awards were presented by the Hon Charles Chauvel, list MP for the Labour Party. Axel Wilke was the MC for the event. The 2006 awards were again sponsored by SPARC.

2007 awards function

The 5th awards were held on 1 November 2007 in Napier in conjunction with the 6th New Zealand Cycling Conference. For the first time, the category 'Cycling Champion of the Year' was included. 15 finalists were honoured, with five nominees taking out the sought after winners' trophies. The awards were presented by the Hon Annette King, who at the time was the Minister of Transport. Axel Wilke was the MC for the event. The 2007 awards were again sponsored by SPARC.

2008 awards function

The 6th awards were held in Christchurch in the Canterbury Provincial Council Chambers on 2 October 2008. 15 finalists were honoured, with five nominees taking out the winners' trophies. The awards were presented by the Hon Lianne Dalziel, at the time the minister of commerce, who spoke on behalf of the transport minister Annette King. Axel Wilke was the MC for the event. The 2008 awards were sponsored by Avanti.

2009 awards function

The 7th awards were held on 12 November 2009 in New Plymouth in conjunction with the 7th New Zealand Cycling Conference. 15 finalists were honoured, with five nominees taking out the sought after winners' trophies. One of the finalists was the Hon John Key, Prime Minister of New Zealand, for the New Zealand Cycle Trail, in the 'Cycling Champion of the Year' category. The awards were presented by Jonathan Young MP, the electorate MP for New Plymouth. Axel Wilke was the MC for the event. CAN was the main sponsor of the 2009 awards.

2010 awards function
The 8th awards were held on 29 October 2010 in Wellington, presented by Fran Wilde at the chambers of Wellington City Council. Nineteen finalists are competing for the five awards. The MC was Glen Koorey, with Wellington Mayor Celia Wade-Brown appearing as a guest speaker.

2011/12 awards function

The 9th awards were planned to be held in conjunction with the 2011 Cycling Conference; however this was combined with the NZ Walking Conference. Therefore, the awards function was held in early 2012 in conjunction with 2WALKandCYCLE, the inaugural New Zealand Walking and Cycling Conference in Hastings. The awards were held during the conference dinner in the Hastings Opera House on 23 February 2012. Five cycle friendly awards, three Golden Foot awards (by Living Streets Aotearoa and an inaugural joint walking and cycling award were handed out. The awards were presented by Associate Transport Minister Chris Tremain, and the MC was Greg Cooper.

2013/14 awards function
The winners of the 10th awards were announced at the 2014 2WALKandCYCLE Conference in Nelson on 29 October 2014. The MC was Greg Cooper and the awards were presented by Sarah Ulmer.

Organisations/Areas with multiple successes
Several organisations have won the Cycle Friendly Awards or been nominated finalist several times.

The most successful organisation is the New Zealand Transport Agency and its predecessor organisations Land Transport Safety Authority, Land Transport New Zealand and Transit New Zealand. Those organisations were category winners four times (in 2004, 2007, 2008 and 2012 jointly with DoC), and finalists an additional six times (2006, twice in 2008, 2009, 2010, 2012).

The next most successful organisation to date is Nelson City Council, with three category wins (in 2005, 2007 and 2009, all in the public organisation category), and an additional six finalist nominations (2004, 2005, three times in 2006 and in 2009 across various categories). Ride On Nelson has also received a finalist nomination.

Current Model Walking/Cycling Community Hastings District Council has recently picked up a number of honours, with two category wins in 2012 and three other finalist nominations in 2010 and 2012. Two other Hastings-based initiatives also won categories in 2010.

Fellow Model Community New Plymouth District Council had one category win in 2008 and have subsequently picked five further finalist nominations. New Plymouth also won the inaugural joint Walking/Cycling Award in 2012 for their "Let's Go - Walk, Ride, Bus" programme.

Auckland Council and its constituent City Council predecessors won Cycle Friendly Awards in 2004 and 2009 (both facility category) and were finalists an additional nine times (in 2004 twice, 2005, 2007 thrice, 2008, 2009, 2012). Seven other Auckland-based initiatives have also been category winners.

Christchurch City Council won a Cycle Friendly Award in 2005 (facility category) and was a finalist an additional six times (with four of those in the inaugural year 2003, and once in 2004 and 2006). Five other Christchurch-based initiatives have also been category winners.

See also
Cycling in New Zealand

References

External links 
 Cycle Friendly Awards
 New Zealand Cycling Conference

Cycling in New Zealand
New Zealand awards